Ekka Raja Rani is a 1994 Bollywood action drama film directed by Afzal Ahmed Khan, produced by Xavier Marquis starring Vinod Khanna and Govinda.

Plot
Vishal Kapoor alias V.K is an underworld Don of Mumbai. Asha is in love with V.K. However, she gets no response from V.K as he does not believe in love. V.K has his beloved friend Pasha who sacrifices his life to save V.K. Before death, Pasha took an oath from V.K that he will take care of his brother Sagar. Barkha is a good dancer. However, she is being kicked out by her guru on account of jealousy. One day, the enemies of V.K plant a time bomb under his car. Barkha is watching all this activity. When V.K is about to sit in the car. Barkha drags V.K away from the car. Hence saving his life. V.K appreciates what Barkha has done for him and offers her to remain in his house as a guest. Homeless, Barkha has no choice but to accept the offer. At V.K's house, Barkha faces some problems with Sagar initially but falls in love with him later. Meanwhile, not knowing Barkha and Sagar are in love, V.K also starts to have feelings for Barkha. In her love, he leaves drinking. V.K arranges a party to announce his engagement with Barkha. When he proposes to her, she turns him down, and tells him that she loves Sagar. Enraged, Vicky starts to drink again. Sagar and Barkha leave the house. Nageshwar Rao being an enemy of V.K takes advantage of the situation and started to create misunderstandings between V.K and Sagar. Initially, he was successful in doing so. Later on, after the interference of Dr. Asha (V. K's lover), the real bone of contention was revealed to V.K and Sagar. Both kill Nageshwar. Sagar marries Barkha and V.K marries Asha and all live happily.

Cast

Vinod Khanna as  Vishal 'Vicky' Kapoor
Govinda as  Sagar
Ayesha Jhulka as Barkha
Ashwini Bhave as Asha
Paresh Rawal as Nageshwar Rao
Tinnu Anand as Dhalal
Anil Dhawan as Pasha
Bharat Kapoor as Police Commissioner
Johnny Lever as Guruji (Dancemaster)
Mushtaq Khan as Dharma, Vicky's Assistant
Tej Sapru as Kali
Sudhir Dalvi as  Police Constable, Asha's Father
Rajendra Nath as John
Ishrat Ali as Mr. Dhanraj
Sudhir as DSP Gaekwad
Shiva Rindani as Rajeshswar Rao, elder brother of Nageshwar 
Vikas Anand as Builder

Soundtrack

References

External links 
 

1990s Hindi-language films
1994 films
1990s action comedy-drama films
Films scored by Nadeem–Shravan
1994 comedy-drama films
Indian action comedy-drama films